XVIII. Armeekorps was formed in Salzburg, Austria, on 1 April 1938, following the Anschluss of Austria into the German Reich. During the life of the XVIII. Armeekorps, they took part in the Polish campaign, Fall Weiss, and the campaign in the West 1940 (Fall Gelb and Fall Rot), and performed occupation duties in France. On 30 October 1940, the Corps gave up some elements to newly forming XXXXIX. Gebirgskorps, and on 1 November, they re-designated the Korps name to XVIII. Gebirgskorps.

Commanders
XVIII Armeekorps
General der Infanterie Eugen Beyer (1 April 1938 – June 1940)
Generalleutnant Hermann Ritter von Speck (June 1940 – 15 June 1940)
General der Gebirgstruppe Franz Böhme (15 June 1940 – 1 November 1940)

XVIII Gebirgskorps
General der Gebirgstruppe Franz Böhme (1 November 1940 – October 1942)
General der Gebirgstruppe Karl Eglseer (10 December 1943 – 23 June 1944)
General der Infanterie Friedrich Hochbaum (23 June 1944 – May 1945)

Order of battle

3 September 1941 - 5. Gebirgs-Division, 713. Infanterie-Division, 164. Infanterie-Division
12 August 1942 - SS-Gebirgs-Division "Nord", Elements of 7. Gebirgs-Division, Elements of 163. Infanterie-Division
20 May 1944 - SS-Gebirgs-Division "Nord", Division Kräutler, 7. Gebirgs-Division
16 September 1944 - 7. Gebirgs-Division, SS-Gebirgs-Division "Nord", Division z.b.V. 140
1 March 1945 - 32. Infanterie-Division, 215. Infanterie-Division

Area of Operation

References

Lexikon der Wehrmacht 

Army,18
Military units and formations established in 1938
Military units and formations disestablished in 1945